General elections were held in Sweden on 15 September 1968. Held in the wake of the crushing of the Prague spring, it resulted in a landslide victory for the Social Democratic government and Prime Minister Tage Erlander. It is one of two general elections in Swedish history where a single party received more than half of the vote (the other being the election of 1940). Erlander would resign the following year after an uninterrupted tenure of 23 years as head of government.

The Social Democrats had held the office of Prime Minister since 1932 except a three-month "holiday cabinet" in 1936. This was due to the Social Democrats' absolute majority in the First chamber and a steady majority for them in general elections and also at large in municipality and county council elections, of which the latter gave them the majority in the First chamber. When they did not have an absolute majority in the Andra kammaren, the Social Democrats could rely on a passive support from the Communists as the  Social Democrats almost always nearly had half of the seats there. The two socialist parties in the Riksdag did not however win a majority in the general elections of 1952 and 1956.

Results

Notes

References

General elections in Sweden
Sweden
General
Sweden